Jenaro Herrera is the capital of the Jenaro Herrera District in the Requena Province of Peru. The village was founded in 1954 by Manuel Gordon Magne, a lieutenant colonel (then a lieutenant) of the Guardia Civil del Perú. It is named for Jenaro Herrera, the first lawyer in Loreto, the region that encompasses the village.

References

1954 establishments in Peru
Populated places established in 1954
Populated places in the Loreto Region
Regional capital cities in Peru